Nasiyanur is a panchayat town located adjoining the city of Erode in Erode district in the Indian state of Tamil Nadu. It is located on National Highway NH 544 between Perundurai and Chithode.

Demographics
 India census, Nasiyanur had a population of 9,902. Males constitute 51% of the population and females 49%. Nasiyanur has an average literacy rate of 60%, higher than the national average of 59.5%: male literacy is 71%, and female literacy is 50%. In Nasiyanur, 9% of the population is under 6 years of age. Nasiyanur is an evergreen place. The main occupation is agriculture, followed by textiles and then poultry.

See also 
 TexValley 
 ETMA Turmeric Market Complex

References

Cities and towns in Erode district